San Miguel de Corpanqui District is one of fifteen districts of the province Bolognesi in Peru.

See also 
 Shinwaqucha

References

Districts of the Bolognesi Province
Districts of the Ancash Region